Dasaratha Deb Memorial College (DDMC), established in 1979, is a general degree college in Khowai, Tripura. It offers undergraduate courses in arts, commerce and sciences. It is affiliated to  Tripura University.

Accreditation
The college is recognized by the University Grants Commission (UGC).

See also
Education in India
Education in Tripura
Tripura University
Literacy in India

References

External links

 Official website
 

Colleges affiliated to Tripura University
Educational institutions established in 1979
Universities and colleges in Tripura
1979 establishments in Tripura
Colleges in Tripura